= Sema Parc Hotel =

Hotel in Bucharest

General information
- Status: Project
- Location: Bucharest, Romania
- Construction started: on hold
- Opening: unknown
- Cost: US$35,000,000
- Owner: River Invest

Height
- Roof: 75 m (246 ft)

Technical details
- Floor count: 22
- Floor area: 18,000 m^{2} (190,000 sq ft) each

Sema Parc Hotel is a 5-star hotel project in Bucharest. The project consists of a 22-floor building with a surface of 18,000 m^{2} (190,000 sq ft) to serve as a 400-room hotel.
